Na Hang is a township of Na Hang District, Tuyên Quang Province, Vietnam.

References

Populated places in Tuyên Quang province
District capitals in Vietnam
Townships in Vietnam